Rujan or Rujen, is a mountain in southern Serbia, near the town of Bujanovac. On the mountain, there is Kale-Krševica archeological site, dating from the 13th century BC. The Pčinja flows through the valley of Rujen.

References

Mountains of Serbia
Rhodope mountain range